Kysyndy (Qıśındı) is a rural locality (a village) in Krasnozilimsky Selsoviet, Arkhangelsky District, Bashkortostan, Russia. The population was 304 as of 2010. There are 3 streets.

Geography 
Kysyndy is located 13 km southwest of Arkhangelskoye (the district's administrative centre) by road. Zaitovo is the nearest rural locality.

References 

Rural localities in Arkhangelsky District